Elle Hearns (born 1986/1987) is an American transgender rights activist. She co-founded the Black Lives Matter Global Network, where she served as a strategic partner and organizing coordinator, and founded The Marsha P. Johnson Institute, where she serves as executive director.

Early life and education
Hearns was born in Columbus, Ohio. She grew up in a single-parent home with two sisters. She struggled being raised as a "little black boy who was existentially trapped in a boy’s body, but was definitely very much so female." Before discovering that she was transgender, she thought she was gay, and dealt with suicidal thoughts as she thought being gay was a sin.

Hearns was very interested in black power, and educated herself about Malcolm X and the civil rights movement.  She became a youth organizer, and later attended Central State University, a historically black university in Wilberforce, Ohio.

Career
In 2013, Hearns co-founded the Black Lives Matter Global Network. As a strategic partner and organizing coordinator, she helped develop policy for the network, including the 2016 policy platform "A Vision for Black Lives". She co-organized a National Day of Action in 2015 to bring attention to the black trans women who were killed that year.

In 2015, Hearns was one of the organizers of The Movement for Black Lives, a national three-day conference in Cleveland, Ohio.

Hearns founded The Marsha P. Johnson Institute, where she serves as executive director. The mission of the institute, which is set to launch in Spring 2018, is to train and support black trans women and gender-nonconforming femmes.

Hearns has also served as a coordinator for GetEQUAL and as an ambassador for the Trans Women of Color Collective (TWOCC). Her writings have been featured in publications including the City University of New York Law Review and Ebony.

Activism
In 2015, Hearns appeared on Democracy Now! and All Things Considered, discussing the shooting of Tamir Rice.

In February 2017, Hearns, along with other trans activists, criticized the pussyhat that had become a symbol of the 2017 Women's March, stating that the movement needs to be truly intersectional and consider the "anatomy of all people".

In August 2017, Hearns and fellow organizers at the Marsha P. Johnson Institute, along with other trans activists, spoke out against an episode of The Breakfast Club radio show where remarks were made about trans women. Comedian Lil Duval joked about killing a sex partner if she turned out to be transgender, and host Charlamagne Tha God, while noting that killing a trans person was a hate crime, stated that women not disclosing their trans status were "taking away a person's power of choice" and "should go to jail or something". Hearns and her colleagues circulated a petition calling for the program to be taken off the air.

On September 30, 2017, Hearns spoke at The March for Black Women in Washington, D.C. about the sisterhood between transgender and cisgender black women.

Honors and recognition
 2017 – Essence "Woke 100 Women"
 2017 – The Root 100 Most Influential African Americans

Personal life
Hearns moved to the Washington D.C. area in 2014. She now splits her time between D.C. and New York City.

References

External links
 

1980s births
African-American activists
21st-century American writers
21st-century American women writers
Black Lives Matter people
Central State University alumni
LGBT African Americans
LGBT people from Ohio
People from Columbus, Ohio
Living people
Transgender women
Transgender rights activists
21st-century African-American women writers
21st-century African-American writers
20th-century African-American people
20th-century African-American women